Edward McKnight Kauffer (14 December 1890 – 22 October 1954) was an American artist and graphic designer who lived for much of his life in the United Kingdom. He worked mainly in poster art, but was also active as a painter, book illustrator and theatre designer.

Early life and education 

Edward Leland Kauffer was born on 14 December 1890, in Great Falls, Montana. By 1910 he had moved to San Francisco working as a bookseller and studying art at the California School of Design from 1910 to 1912. At around this time Professor Joseph McKnight of the University of Utah became aware of Kauffer's work, sponsored him and paid to send him to Paris for further study. In gratitude Kauffer took his sponsor's name as a middle name.

Career 
Kauffer stopped in Chicago for six months in 1912/1913 and studied at the Art Institute of Chicago. While there he witnessed the Armory Show, one of the first major exhibitions to introduce the styles of modernism to American viewers. This likely had a major impact on Kauffer, who would work in many of the same styles throughout his career. He arrived in Paris in 1913 and studied at the Académie Moderne until 1914.

With the outbreak of the First World War in 1914, he moved to London with his new wife, American pianist Grace (née Ehrlich). Their daughter, Ann (6 October 1920 - 1996) would join the Women’s Auxiliary Air Force in the Second World War and work in photo intelligence alongside Constance Babington Smith, Eve Holiday, and Sarah Oliver, (Winston Churchill's daughter).

In Paris in 1923 he met the textile designer Marion Dorn (1896–1964). He left his wife and daughter and subsequently lived with her in London, from late 1923 to July 1940. They married in 1950 and moved to New York until his death in 1954.

Kauffer moved to London upon the start of the First World War, and remained there for most of his career. He was briefly associated with Robert Bevan's Cumberland Market Group and had a one-man show at the Omega Workshops. In Brighton on the south coast, he designed a "novel" mural for the lobby of Embassy Court, a Modernist block of flats designed by Wells Coates in 1935. The mural consisted of "monochrome photographs ... printed directly on to a light-sensitive cellulose coating".
 
Kauffer may be best known for the 140 posters that he produced for London Underground, and later London Transport. The posters span many styles: many show abstract influences, including futurism, cubism, and vorticism; others evoke impressionist influences such as Japanese woodcuts.

He created posters for Shell Oil, the Great Western Railway and other commercial clients, and also illustrated books and book covers. Later he also became interested in textiles, interior design and theatrical design. He designed the cover of the Radio Times' 1926 and 1927 Christmas Numbers.

He returned to New York City in 1940 at the beginning of the Second World War, and tried to find work in advertising. He struggled in the more competitive atmosphere until he was approached to do a series of posters for American Airlines in 1947. American Airlines remained his primary client until his death in 1954.

References

Further reading
 Graham Twemlow, 'E McKnight Kauffer - The stencilled book illustrations', in Parenthesis; 16 (2009 February), p. 32-34
 Desmond Flower, 'The Book Illustrations of E. McKnight Kauffer', in Penrose Annual; 50 (1956), p. 35-40
 Knighton, Mary A. “Strange Fruit and Patriotic Flowers: E. McKnight Kauffer’s Illustrated South.” Southern Cultures Vol. 25, No. 4 (Here/Away Special Issue): 54–81.
 Knighton, Mary A. “Racial Debts, Individual Slights, and Sleights of Hand in Faulkner’s Intruder in the Dust.” Faulkner and Money: Faulkner and Yoknapatawpha, 2017, ed. Jay Watson and James G. Thomas, Jr. (Jackson: UP of Mississippi, July 2019). 186–207. 
 Knighton, Mary A. “Lines of Correspondence: E. McKnight Kauffer’s Original Dust Jacket Art for William Faulkner’s Requiem for a Nun.” Notes and Queries Vol. 64, No. 4 (November 2017): 665–668.

External links

 
 

American graphic designers
American illustrators
American poster artists
1890 births
1954 deaths
People from Great Falls, Montana
Artists from Montana
San Francisco Art Institute alumni
School of the Art Institute of Chicago alumni
American expatriates in the United Kingdom
Group X
AIGA medalists